Millard Powers Fillmore (April 25, 1828 – November 15, 1889) was a lawyer and one of two children, and only son, of U.S. President Millard Fillmore and his first wife, Abigail Powers.

Early life
Millard Powers Fillmore, known familiarly as "Powers", was born on April 25, 1828, in Aurora, New York to Millard Fillmore (1800–1874) and his first wife, Abigail Powers (1798–1853). In 1828, the year he was born, his father was elected to the New York State Assembly as a member of the Anti-Masonic Party. His maternal grandparents were Reverend Lemuel Powers Jr., a Baptist minister, and Abigail Newland-Powers. His paternal grandparents were Phoebe Millard Fillmore and Nathaniel Fillmore Jr., a farmer. His maternal great-grandparents in part of his maternal grandfather, were Lt. Lemuel Powers Sr. and Thankful Powers. In part of his maternal grandmother, were  Joseph Newland and Abigail Newland Powers Strong. His paternal great-grandparents in part of his paternal grandfather, were Lt. Nathaniel Fillmore Sr. and Hebzibah Fillmore. In part of his paternal grandmother, were Dr. Abiathar Millard Fillmore and Tabitha Millard Fillmore. His sister was Mary Abigail Fillmore.

Career
He studied law in his father's office and graduated from Harvard Law School in 1849.  He served as his father's private secretary during the latter's presidency. After practicing law in Buffalo, New York as the partner of E. Carleton Sprague, he was appointed a federal court clerk.

Personal life
After the death of his mother, in 1853, his father married Caroline Carmichael McIntosh; a union which Millard Powers Fillmore reportedly never accepted. Following his father's death, he engaged in a bitter battle with his stepmother over the terms of his father's will, which young Millard won.

Millard Powers Fillmore never married and had no children, so he was his father's last surviving descendant. He died of apoplexy in Buffalo on November 15, 1889. Fillmore was buried at Forest Lawn Cemetery in Buffalo.  His will directed that all his family correspondence (including that with his father) be burned, the motive for which was the subject of much speculation.

References

External links
 

1828 births
1889 deaths
Children of presidents of the United States
Children of vice presidents of the United States
Personal secretaries to the President of the United States
Harvard Law School alumni
New York (state) lawyers
Lawyers from Buffalo, New York
Milard Powers
19th-century American politicians
Burials at Forest Lawn Cemetery (Buffalo)
19th-century American lawyers